Eagle Vision is a Canadian independent film and television production company based in Winnipeg, Manitoba, Canada. It is an Aboriginally-owned production company founded in 1999 by Lisa Meeches, President of Meeches Video Productions Inc. and Wayne Sheldon, President of MidCanada Production Services Inc.

Eagle Vision is currently run by Meeches and producer Kyle Irving, son of Bob Irving, a well-known Canadian sportscaster.

In 2006, Eagle Vision was co-producer of the Oscar and Golden Globe award-winning film Capote.

In television, Eagle Vision is primarily known for its Aboriginal TV series.

Film productions (past and present) 
 Orphan: First Kill (2022)
 Night Raiders (2021)
 Lovesick (2016)
 Hard Way Girl (2016)
 Reasonable Doubt (2014)
 Sea Legs
 We Were Children (2012)
 Walk All over Me (2007)
 Blue State (2006)
 Capote (2005)

Television productions 
 Burden of Truth
 Taken 
 Ice Road Truckers 
 Jack
 Elijah
 Indigenous Music Awards
 Rising Stars
 Kyle Riabko: The Lead
 Polygamy's Lost Boys
 Celebrate: The Music of Our People The Sharing Circle The Spirit of Norway House Tipi Tales We Joggin' Where Three Rivers Meet''

References 
 Official Site

Companies based in Winnipeg
Indigenous film and television production companies in Canada
Indigenous organizations in Manitoba
Canadian companies established in 1999
Mass media companies established in 1999
1999 establishments in Manitoba